Gilbert River is a rural locality in the Shire of Etheridge, Queensland, Australia. In the  Gilbert River had a population of 38 people.

Geography 
The locality is roughly bounded to the south by the Gregory Range which extends into neighbouring Croydon, Esmeralda and Northhead and beyond. 

Gilbert River has the following mountains:

The western part of the locality is a protected area being within the Littleton National Park and the Littleton Resources Reserve. The remainder of the land is used for grazing on native vegetation with a small amount of pasture around the Gilbert River.

Road infrastructure
The Richmond–Croydon Road runs through the south-western corner.

History
Jangga, also known as Yangga, is a language of Central Queensland. The Jangga language region includes the landscape within the local government boundaries of the Etheridge Shire Council.

The locality takes its name from the Gilbert River which flows through the locality.

Gilbert River Provisional School opened on 8 May 1899. On 1 January 1909 it became Gilbert River State School. It closed in 1923. It reopened in 1954 and then closed in 1961.

In the  Gilbert River had a population of 38 people.

Economy 
There are a number of homesteads in the locality, including:

 Chadshunt
 Inorunie
 Lake Calo
 Rockfields

Transport 
Littleton Airstrip (also known as Inorunie) is an airstrip just inside the national park and immediately south of the Inorunie homestead.

References 

Shire of Etheridge
Localities in Queensland